Posad is a rural locality (a selo) and the administrative center of Posadskoye Rural Settlement, Kishertsky District, Perm Krai, Russia. The population was 1,268 as of 2010. There are 18 streets.

Geography 
Posad is located 8 km north of Ust-Kishert (the district's administrative centre) by road. Fomichi is the nearest rural locality.

References 

Rural localities in Kishertsky District